St. Francis Xavier's Church is a parish of the Roman Catholic Church in Pizhala, Kerala, in the Archdiocese of Verapoly.

History

First Church Construction

Second Church Construction 

Fr. Joseph Moonjappilly was the vicar during this period

Third Church Construction 

 
Fr. John Kanakkassery, was the vicar during this period

Different Periods of St. Francis Xavier's Church, Pizhala 

St. Francis Xavier's Church  has been growing through three  Different periods since 1892

Period Under Verapoly Parish

Period Under Kothad Parish

Period of Independence Since 1939 May 28

Missionaries from Pizhala parish

Priests from Pizhala Parish

Nuns from Pizhala Parish

References

External links 

Roman Catholic churches in Kochi
Roman Catholic churches completed in 1892
19th-century Roman Catholic church buildings in India